The Girl in the Sneakers is a 1999 Iranian drama film directed by Rasul Sadr Ameli.

Cast 
 Pegah Ahangarani - Tadai
 Majid Hajizadeh - Aideen
 Akram Mohammadi - Mahpareh
 Abdolreza Akbari

References

External links 

1999 drama films
1999 films
1990s Persian-language films
Iranian drama films